Elections for the National Interim Assembly were held in Hungary in November 1944. Members were elected at public meetings in 45 cities and towns in areas held by the Red Army. An additional 160 members were elected in liberated areas on 2 April and 24 June 1945.

The Hungarian Communist Party won 89 of the 230 seats, increasing to 166 of the 498 seats after the 1945 elections. The Assembly first convened in Debrecen on 21 and 22 December 1944, establishing a new government and declaring war on Nazi Germany. Its second session was held in Budapest in September 1945, establishing fresh elections and passing legislation on land redistribution.

Results

References

Hungary
Hungary
Elections in Hungary
Parliamentary
Parliamentary
Hungary
Hungary
Hungary